Globe Yarn Mills are two historic textile mills located at 460 Globe Street in Fall River, Massachusetts.

The company was incorporated in 1881 for the manufacture of cotton yarns. Mill No. 1 was completed in 1881. William J. Jennings was the first president. Mill No. 2 was built in 1885 also from red brick. The company would later be acquired by the New Bedford Cotton Yarn Company, then American Cotton Fabric Company, and later the Connecticut Company in 1920.

The site was added to the National Register of Historic Places in 1983. Globe Yarn Mills No. 3, built in 1887 on nearby Globe Mills Avenue was added under a separate listing with the Sanford Spinning Co.

For many years the mills were the site of Globe Mill Discount Center and also a flea market.

See also
National Register of Historic Places listings in Fall River, Massachusetts
List of mills in Fall River, Massachusetts

References

Textile mills in Fall River, Massachusetts
Industrial buildings and structures on the National Register of Historic Places in Massachusetts
National Register of Historic Places in Fall River, Massachusetts